Bunene Ngaduane  (born 30 July 1972 in Kinshasa) is a former Congolese professional football striker who played for Ankaragücü in Turkey and Qwa Qwa Stars and Moroka Swallows FC in South Africa.

Ngaduane enjoyed success with Qwa Qwa Stars, and was the third leading scorer in the South African National Soccer League during the 1993 season, scoring 18 goals.

Ngaduane was included in the Zaire national football team at the 1996 African Cup of Nations.

References

External links
 Profile at TFF.org
 PSL Best Foreign Strikers - Ngaduane No. 9

1972 births
Living people
Democratic Republic of the Congo footballers
Democratic Republic of the Congo international footballers
Democratic Republic of the Congo expatriate footballers
Moroka Swallows F.C. players
Free State Stars F.C. players
MKE Ankaragücü footballers
Süper Lig players
Expatriate footballers in Turkey
Expatriate soccer players in South Africa
Democratic Republic of the Congo expatriate sportspeople in Turkey
Democratic Republic of the Congo expatriate sportspeople in South Africa
Association football forwards
Footballers from Kinshasa
1994 African Cup of Nations players
1996 African Cup of Nations players
21st-century Democratic Republic of the Congo people